Parliamentary elections were held in Austria on 21 October 1923. The result was a victory for the Christian Social Party, which won 82 of the 165 seats. Voter turnout was 87.0%.

Results

References

Elections in Austria
Austria
Austria